Ziltendorf is a municipality in the Oder-Spree district, in Brandenburg, Germany.

Demography

Mayor 
Danny Langhagel (CDU) was elected in May 2014 for a term of five years.

References

Localities in Oder-Spree